Obey Giant: The Art and Dissent of Shepard Fairey is a 2017 American documentary film directed and produced by James Moll about the life and career of street artist and graphic designer Shepard Fairey. The film covers "Fairey's life from his beginning doodles to his iconic "Hope" poster for the Obama campaign and Obey campaigns."  It premiered on Hulu on November 11, 2017.

Premise
The documentary follows "the life and work of artist Shepard Fairey, going deep into the world of street art and its role in politics and pop culture. Obey Giant follows Fairey's rise from his roots in punk rock and skateboarding, to his role as one of the most well-known and influential street artists in the world - through his iconic Obama "HOPE" poster and the controversy that surrounds it."

See also
List of original programs distributed by Hulu

References

External links

2017 documentary films
American documentary films
Documentary films about television
Documentary films about visual artists
Films directed by James Moll
Hulu original films
2010s English-language films
2010s American films
English-language documentary films